The 63rd Army was a field army established by the Soviet Union's Red Army during World War II.

First Formation
The Army was formed on July 10, 1942 from the 5th Reserve Army, a part of the Reserve of the Supreme High Command.

Since July 12, 1942 the army was incorporated into the newly created Stalingrad Front for defensive battles on approaches to Stalingrad. On September 30, 1942 Stalingrad Front was renamed as Don Front for the battle within the city. On October 29, 1942 the army subordinated to the reconstructed Southwestern Front for the Operation Uranus counter-offensive.

On November 4, 1942, the 63rd Army was granted Guards status and briefly transformed into the 1st Guards Army (Second Formation) before being split and reformed into the 3rd Guards Army on 5 December.

Second Formation
April 27, 1943 the Army was formed for the second time on the basis of the 2nd Reserve Army.  Originally it consisted of the 129th, 235th, 250th, 348th, 380th and 397th Rifle Divisions, artillery, engineering, and other parts. On April 29, 1943 the army was incorporated into the Bryansk Front. Initially it conducted defensive operations along the Zusha and Neruch Rivers and the region south of Mtsensk. It participated in Operation Kutuzov at Orel, and the Briansk and Gomel-Rechitsa Offensives. With Markian Popov's Bryansk Front at the Battle of Kursk it comprised the 5th, 41st, 129th, 250th, 287th, 348th and 397th Rifle Divisions. On October 8, 1943 the army was assigned to the Central Front (renamed as Belorussian Front on October 20, 1943). It was disbanded on February 18, 1944, with its troops transferred to the 3rd and 48th armies.

Commanders 
 Lieutenant General Vasily Kuznetzov (4 July – 1 November 1942)
 Lieutenant General Vasily Morozov (8 March – 14 May 1943)
 Lieutenant General Vladimir Kolpakchi (14 May 1943 – 10 February 1944)

Structure on 1 August 1942
Army headquarters
14th Guards Rifle Division – General-major Afanasy Gryaznov (17 July to 31 December 1942)
1st Rifle Division- General-major Semenov (17 July to 31 December 1942)
127th Rifle Division – Colonel Zaitzev (17 July to 22 September 1942)
153rd Rifle Division – Colonel Nikitin (17 July December to 31 1942); Colonel Karnov (from 11 October 1942)
197th Rifle Division – General-major Zaporozhchenko (17 July to 31 December 1942)
203rd Rifle Division – Colonel Kashlayev (17 July to 31 December 1942) ; Colonel Zdanovich (from 3 September 1942)
36th Tank Brigade
134th Tank Brigade
193rd Tank Brigade
646th Tank Battalion
647th Tank Battalion
1110th Artillery Regiment
1180th Anti-Tank Artillery Regiment
1249th Anti-Tank Artillery Regiment
1250th Anti-Tank Artillery Regiment
51st Guards Mortar Regiment
58th Guards Mortar Regiment
79th Guards Mortar Regiment
1413rd Sapper Battalion
1486th Sapper Battalion

Structure on 1 October 1942 
Army headquarters
14th Guards Rifle Division
1st Rifle Division
153rd Rifle Division
197th Rifle Division
203rd Rifle Division
6th Guards Cavalry Division- Colonel Belogorodskyi (26 July – 31 December 1942)
1110th Artillery Regiment
1180th Anti-Tank Artillery Regiment
1249th Anti-Tank Artillery Regiment
1250th Anti-Tank Artillery Regiment
1257th Anti-Aircraft Artillery Regiment
26th Machine-gun Battalion
28th Machine-gun Battalion
350th Independent Engineer Brigade
1486th Sapper Battalion

Sources and further reading
 Filippov H.C., Don Shield of Stalingrad, Volgograd, 1969
 http://samsv.narod.ru/Arm/a63/arm.html – Further Reading

063
Military units and formations established in 1942
Military units and formations disestablished in 1944